The Bien Hoa–Vung Tau Expressway (CT.28) is an expressway planned in the Southeast region of Vietnam. With a total length of 77.6 km, this expressway when completed is expected to connect Dong Nai with Ba Ria - Vung Tau.. The design speed is 100 km/h and the road will have 4 lanes.
According to the project proposal investment report of the Transport Design Consultancy Corporation (TEDI), the expressway is 77.6 km long. Of which, the expressway section is 66 km long, the urban road part is about 2.8 km, and the part of scale II is about 8.8 km. Of these, the section Bien Hoa - Phu My (expressway) is 38 km long; section of Phu My - coastal road of Ho Chi Minh City. Vung Tau (expressway) is 28 km long; from the coastal road of the Vung Tau City to National Route 51C is 2.8 km long and the section connecting Phu My - National Road 51 (to Cai Mep - Thi Vai port) is 8.8 km long.

Development
The route yet to be built has been divided into two sections by the Ministry of Transport. The proposed route will be east of highway 51.
Bien Hoa-Phu My
This section will be 46.8 km long. Investment cost is estimated at 14,956 billion VND. This section will be constructed first.
Phu My-Vung Tau
This section will be 31 km long.

Interchange list

References

Expressways in Vietnam